Khwaja Shāh Kalīm Allāh Jahānābādī (شاه كليم الله جهانابادي) b. Nūr Allāh b. Aḥmad al-Miʿmār al-Ṣiddīqī (1650-1729) was a leading Chistī saint of the late Mughal period and is considered to be instrumental in the revival of the Chistī and Mir Sayyid Ali Hamadani ṣūfī ṭarīqah (path). His father, Noor Ullah, was a well-known astronomer and calligraphist. He was the grandson of Ustād Aḥmad Lahorī, the architect of the Taj Mahal and Lal Qila.

Legacy
Among his successors are Syed Shah Yousufain and Syed Shah Sharifuddin

In the popular discourses of modern India he is remembered for his inclusivist approach to Hindus. The shrine of Kaleem Ullah Shah is situated opposite of the Red Fort, beside the Meena Bazaar, Old Delhi.

Works
Tilka ʿAsharat Kāmilah
Kashkūl Kalīmī
Maktūbāt-i Kalīmī
Muraqqā Kalimi
Sawa alssabeel e kaleemi.

References

1650 births
1729 deaths
Chishti Order
Indian Sufi saints
Taj Mahal